Oleg Vladimirovich Nikolayev (born 21 May 1998) is a Russian football player. He plays for FC Tyumen.

Club career
He made his debut in the Russian Professional Football League for FC Rotor Volgograd on 28 July 2016 in a game against FC Mashuk-KMV Pyatigorsk.

He made his Russian Football National League debut for Rotor on 8 July 2017 in a game against FC Khimki.

He made his Russian Premier League debut for FC Rotor Volgograd on 11 August 2020 in a game against FC Zenit Saint Petersburg.

On 19 January 2021, he joined FC Volgar Astrakhan on loan until the end of the 2020–21 season.

References

External links
 
 
 
 Profile by Russian Professional Football League

1998 births
Footballers from Luhansk
Living people
Russian footballers
Association football defenders
Association football midfielders
FC Olimpia Volgograd players
FC Rotor Volgograd players
FC Volgar Astrakhan players
FC Tyumen players
Russian Premier League players
Russian First League players
Russian Second League players